The Erivan Province, also known as Chokhur-e Sa'd, was a province of the Safavid Empire, centered on the territory of the present-day Armenia. Erivan (Yerevan) was the provincial capital and the seat of the Safavid governors.

At the end of the Safavid period, it had the following administrative jurisdictions; Bayazid, Maghazberd (now near Üçbölük village of Arpaçay district), Maku, Nakhchivan, Sadarak, Shadidlu, Zaruzbil, and the tribal district of the Donbolis.

The provinces of Erivan and Qarabagh were the two administrative territories that made up Iranian Armenia.

History
The alternate name of the province, Chokhur-e Sa'd, had been in use since the fourteenth century. The name is derived from a certain Amir Sa'd, the leader of the Turkic Sa'dlu tribe, who had accompanied Timur from Central Asia. The Sa'dlu's had become prominent under their leader, Amir Sa'd, and settled in the Erivan area, where Amir Sa'd became the governor of the area. Chokhur-e Sa'd literally means "Vale of Sa'd".

Historic Armenia, which included the territory of the Erivan Province, made part of the Safavid Empire from its earliest days. In 1502, the first governor of the Erivan Province was appointed by then incumbent King (Shah) Ismail I (1501–1524), and royal Safavid edicts make mention of the province as early as 1505 and 1506. As a result of the Peace of Amasya of 1555, the Safavids, then under King Tahmasp I (1524–1576) were forced to cede the western part of historic Armenia to the expanding Ottomans.

In 1578, the Ottomans invaded the Safavid Empire, and by 1583 they were in possession of the Erivan province. In 1604, Safavid King Abbas I (1588–1629) expelled them and re-established the Safavid sway.

Around the same time, realizing the vulnerability of the province, King Abbas I ordered for the mass deportation and relocation of the Armenians from his Armenian territories (which thus included the Erivan Province), deeper into mainland Iran.

At the beginning of the seventeenth century, some 19,000 converted Catholic Armenians were living in three towns and twelve villages in the Nakhchivan, Ernjak and Jahuk regions, and had ten Catholic churches to serve them. When the Safavid Empire started to decline, in the second half of the 17th century, during the reign of King Suleiman I (1666–1694), the situation of the Catholic Armenians of Nakhchivan deteriorated. As a result of the increasing religious intolerance and misrule by governmental officials, the majority of the Armenian Catholics of Nakchivan had to convert to Islam. The remaining minority either returned to the Armenian Apostolic Church, or migrated to Smyrna, Constantinople, Bursa and other towns in the Ottoman Empire.

In 1639, the Safavids and the Ottomans concluded the Treaty of Zuhab. Eastern Armenia was reconfirmed as being an Iranian domain, whereas Western Armenia was irrevocably lost to the Ottomans. The ensuing period following 1639 was marked by peace and prosperity in the province. At the end of the seventeenth century, the Erivan Province had become a centre of Catholic missionary activities in the empire.

In 1679, the province was the epicenter of an earthquake, which resulted in the destruction and damaging of numerous notable structures.

In 1714, the mayor (kalantar) of the provincial capital, Mohammad Reza Beg, was appointed as the new ambassador to France, and led the embassy to Louis XIV of 1715.

In 1724, the Ottomans and the Russians invaded the crumbling empire. By the Treaty of Constantinople (1724), they agreed to divide the conquered territories between them. Per the treaty, the Ottomans gained the territory of the Erivan Province.

By 1735, Nader-Qoli Beg (later known as Nader Shah) had restored the Safavid sway over the Caucasus, including the Erivan Province. In 1736, he deposed the Safavids and became king himself, establishing Afsharid Iran.

Mint
The provincial capital, Erivan, housed an important Safavid mint. As much of Iran's gold and silver was imported from the Ottoman Empire, the mints near the border such as Erivan, Tabriz and Tiflis (Tbilisi) played an important role in converting foreign specie into Iranian coins. In the 1660s and 1670s, the office of mint master (zarrab-bashi) of Erivan was held by a series of local Armenians. The mint master of Nakhchivan in 1691 was also an Armenian.

Stationed Safavid force
The Erivan Province was of high importance to the Safavids, partly due to the fact that it bordered the Ottoman Empire. The French missionary and traveller Père Sanson, who was in the Safavid Empire during the latter part of King Suleiman I's reign (1666–1694), wrote that some 12,000 Safavid troops were stationed in the Erivan Province.

Religious and ethnic affiliation
Muslims constituted majorities in the province, whereas ethnic Armenians were a minority. Until the mid-fourteenth century, Armenians had constituted a majority in Eastern Armenia. 
At the close of the fourteenth century, after Timur's campaigns, Islam had become the dominant faith, and Armenians became a minority in Eastern Armenia.

List of governors

Notes

References

Sources
 
 
 
 
  
 
 
 
 
 
 
 
 

Provinces of the Safavid dynasty
16th century in Armenia
17th century in Armenia
18th century in Armenia
History of Nakhchivan
History of West Azerbaijan Province